There are over 9,000 Grade I listed buildings in England. This page is a list of these buildings in the district of South Kesteven in Lincolnshire.

South Kesteven

|}

References

Notes

External links

Lists of Grade I listed buildings in Lincolnshire